This is a list of Dutch television related events from 1992.

Events
29 March - Humphrey Campbell is selected to represent Netherlands at the 1992 Eurovision Song Contest with his song "Wijs me de weg". He is selected to be the thirty-fifth Dutch Eurovision entry during Nationaal Songfestival held at NOS Studios in Hilversum.
Unknown - Nhelly Dela Rosa wins the eighth series of Soundmixshow, performing as Shirley Bassey.

Debuts

Television shows

1950s
NOS Journaal (1956–present)

1970s
Sesamstraat (1976–present)

1980s
Jeugdjournaal (1981–present)
Soundmixshow (1985-2002)
Het Klokhuis (1988–present)

1990s
Goede tijden, slechte tijden (1990–present)

Ending this year

Births

Deaths